Mullayar River is a tributary of the Periyar River, the longest river in Kerala. It originates at Kottamalai peak  in the Periyar Tiger Reserve. The Mullayar flows west through the reserve  and joins the Periyar at Mullakudy  just at the beginning of the Periyar lake formed by the Mullaperiyar dam.

See also
 Periyar - Main river

Other major tributaries of Periyar river
Muthirapuzha River
Cheruthoni 
Perinjankutti 
Edamalayar

References

Rivers of Idukki district
Periyar (river)